Willard Jones may refer to:

Willard F. Jones (1890–1967), American naval architect, business executive and philanthropist
Willard N. Jones (1869–?), American civil engineer, timber dealer and convicted felon
Willard S. Jones, American college football coach